Lisa Hensley is an Australian actress who first came to prominence with a leading role in the television mini-series Brides of Christ. She went to high school at Brigidine College, St Ives, Sydney, New South Wales, Australia.

Hensley has also appeared in A Country Practice, 15 Amore, Sons and Daughters, The Flying Doctors, Dating the Enemy, Farscape as Matala, Two Twisted, and All Saints. She currently presents the "From the Heart" program on Qantas airlines’s inflight ON-Q Radio.

External links
 

Living people
AACTA Award winners
Actresses from New South Wales
Australian television personalities
Women television personalities
Australian voice actresses
Australian television actresses
Year of birth missing (living people)